Coresystems AG is a software-developing company, headquartered in Switzerland, and a reseller of SAP Business One and SAP's field service management platform.

History
Coresystems AG was founded in 2006 in Windisch, Aargau. In November 2013, the company raised $15.5 million in its first round of funding from a consortium of private investors, including German tech investor Peter Zencke, a former SAP executive board member and head of research and development.

2014 Coresystems AG started focussing on providing a field service management solution that automates operational tasks such as workforce optimization, scheduling and dispatching, field parts and inventory management, and team collaboration.

At the beginning of 2018, the company split into two separate companies, with a new founded Coresystems FSM AG continuing to focus on field service management software. Coresystems AG remained true to the SAP add-ons, consulting and reselling of SAP products. On June 5, 2018, SAP announced the acquisition of Coresystems FSM AG.

Awards and recognition

In 2013, Manuel Grenacher, founder of Coresystems, was awarded the 2013 Swiss ICT Award as "outstanding personality of the Swiss computer science".

In 2014, the company was nominated for the 2014 Export Award in the category "Success".

According to a 2016 published market research report, "Field Service Management Market - Global Forecast to 2020", published by MarketsandMarkets, Coresystems has been identified as key innovator in the market.

See also

 List of companies of Switzerland
 Cloud computing

References

External links
 

Companies established in 2006
Companies based in Windisch
Cloud computing providers
Information technology companies of Switzerland
2018 mergers and acquisitions
SAP SE acquisitions